Emanuel Lasker won the tournament ahead of Richard Réti.

Tournament table

References
 

Chess competitions
1923 in chess
Chess in Czechoslovakia
1923 in Czechoslovak sport